The Kiến Sơ pagoda is a Buddhist temple in Gia Lâm District of Hanoi, Vietnam. The Chinese monk Vô Ngôn Thông came to reside in the temple around 820 and it became an important base for propagation of Buddhism in Vietnam.

References

Buddhist temples in Hanoi